America Plaza is a station of the Blue and Silver Lines on the San Diego Trolley. It is located in the Downtown Core of San Diego, California, and is directly connected to One America Plaza, the city's tallest building. The station, and its accompanying 34-story high-rise building, opened on November 14, 1991, making the station the second infill station in the San Diego Trolley system.

History

America Plaza originally was where the Orange and Blue lines split. The Orange Line used to loop south and east on its way to Gaslamp Quarter and back to 12th & Imperial Transit Center, while the Blue Line used to turn north towards Santa Fe Depot on its way to Old Town Transit Center. A system redesign on September 2, 2012, shortened the Blue Line's northern terminus to this station, and rerouted the Orange Line to terminate at Santa Fe Depot, while the western portion of the downtown loop was replaced by service from the Green Line. When the Mid-Coast extension was completed on November 21, 2021, the Blue Line was re-extended northward through Santa Fe Depot and Old Town to serve the new stations.

This station was closed from October 21 until December 19, 2011, for renovations as part of the Trolley Renewal Project, during which a temporary stop was erected between Columbia and State streets to serve the area.

On April 29, 2018, the Courthouse station opened as the new terminus of the Orange Line.

Station layout

See also

 List of San Diego Trolley stations

References

Blue Line (San Diego Trolley)
Silver Line (San Diego Trolley)
Railway stations in the United States opened in 1981
San Diego Trolley stations in San Diego
1981 establishments in California